The Reformist Movement (MR) is a liberal French-speaking political party in Belgium. MR is traditionally a conservative-liberal party, but it also contains social-liberal factions.

The party was in coalition as part of the Michel Government and then the Wilmès Government from October 2014, having provided two prime ministers since. After the 2007 general election the MR was the largest Francophone political formation in Belgium, a position that was regained by the Socialist Party in the 2010 general election. It currently serves as part of the seven party De Croo Government.

The MR is an alliance between three French-speaking and one German-speaking liberal parties. The Liberal Reformist Party (PRL) and the Francophone Democratic Federalists (FDF) started the alliance in 1993, and were joined in 1998 by the Citizens' Movement for Change (MCC). The alliance was then known as the PRL-FDF-MCC federation. The alliance became the MR during a congress in 2002, where the German-speaking liberal party, the Party for Freedom and Progress joined as well. The label PRL is no longer used, and the three other parties still use their own names. The MR is a member of Liberal International and the Alliance of Liberals and Democrats for Europe (ALDE) Party. However, on 25 September 2011, the FDF decided to leave the coalition. They did not agree with the manner in which president Charles Michel defended the rights of the French-speaking people in the agreement concerning the splitting of the Brussels-Halle-Vilvoorde district, during the 2010–11 Belgian government formation.

Ideology and policies
Although the MR's original ideology emphasised classical liberalism and free market economics, it joined the general trend of Belgian liberals to accept elements of social liberalism under the influence of Dirk Verhofstadt, whose brother Guy Verhofstadt led the MR's Flemish counterpart, the Open VLD. However, during Georges-Louis Bouchez's tenure as party president, the party shifted to the right.

On its current platform, the party states that it is economically and socially liberal. It supports lower taxes, aims to maximize the well-being of citizens but also wants to fight tax evasion. MR also supports Belgian participation in the European Union and NATO.

Presidents
 2002–2003: Daniel Ducarme
 2003–2004: Antoine Duquesne
 2004–2011: Didier Reynders
 2011–2014: Charles Michel
 2014–2019: Olivier Chastel
 2019: Charles Michel
 2019–present: Georges-Louis Bouchez

Representation in EU Institutions 
In the European Parliament, Mouvément Reformateur sits in the Renew Europe group with two MEPs.

In the European Committee of the Regions, Mouvément Reformateur sits in the Renew Europe CoR group, with two full and one alternate member for the 2020-2025 mandate. Willy Borsus is an ex officio member of the Renew Europe CoR Bureau.

Electoral results

Chamber of Representatives

Senate

Regional

Brussels Parliament

Walloon Parliament

European Parliament

Notable figures
Willy Borsus
Christine Defraigne
Alain Destexhe
Daniel Ducarme
Antoine Duquesne
Jean Gol
Sabine Laruelle
Charles Michel
Louis Michel
Didier Reynders
Jacques Simonet

See also
Liberalism
Liberalism in Belgium
Contributions to liberal theory
Liberalism worldwide
Liberal Archive

References

External links

 

Conservative liberal parties
Classical liberal parties
Francophone political parties in Belgium
Liberal International
Liberal parties in Belgium
Alliance of Liberals and Democrats for Europe Party member parties
Political parties established in 2002
2002 establishments in Belgium
Pro-European political parties in Belgium